The Gresham Carnegie Library, is a historic building in Gresham, Oregon. The Tudor style building designed by Folger Johnson was built in 1913 and was added to the National Register of Historic Places in January 2000. It served as a public library in the Multnomah County Library system from 1913 until December 1989 when the Gresham Library opened.

At that time the Gresham Historical Society purchased the building and opened the Gresham History Museum. The building underwent six-months of renovations in 2012.

See also
 List of Carnegie libraries in Oregon
 National Register of Historic Places listings in Multnomah County, Oregon

References

External links
 Gresham History Museum - Gresham Historical Society

1913 establishments in Oregon
Buildings and structures in Gresham, Oregon
Former library buildings in the United States
Historical society museums in Oregon
Libraries established in 1913
Libraries on the National Register of Historic Places in Oregon
Library buildings completed in 1913
Multnomah County Library
Museums in Multnomah County, Oregon
National Register of Historic Places in Gresham, Oregon